Michael Olheiser (born January 23, 1975 in Forest Lake, Minnesota) is an American former professional road racing cyclist.

Major results

2006 Masters Road Race National Champion (30-34)
2006 Rouge Roubaix winner
2006 UCI Masters Time Trial World Champion (30-34)
2007 UCI Masters Time Trial World Champion (30-34)
2007 Rouge Roubaix winner 2008 Elite Time Trial National Champion
2008 Masters Criterium National Champion (30-34)
2008 Masters Time Trial Champion (30-34)
2008 KOM Tour of Belize 2008 Tour of Belize Stage 5 1st Place
2009 UCI Masters Time Trial World Champion (35-39)
2009 Tour of Southland Stage 8 1st Place
2009 Elite Time Trial National Champion
2009 Elite Elite Road Race National Champion
2009 Masters Criterium National Champion (30-34)
2009 Masters Time Trial National Champion (30-34)
2009 Mt. Hood Cycling Classic Prologue Stage Winner
2010 Elite Time Trial National Champion
2010 Elite Road Race National Champion
2010 Masters Time Trial National Champion (35-39)
2010 Masters Road Race National Champion (35-39)
2011 Mt. Hood Cycling Classic Stage 3 1st Place
2011 Masters Criterium National Champion (35-39)
2011 Masters Time Trial National Champion (35-39)
2012 Nature Valley Gran Prix KOM 2012 UCI Rutas de America Stage 1 1st Place
2012 UCI Rutas de America KOM 2013 Masters Time Trial National Champion (35-39)
2014 USPRO Time Trial 5th Place
2015 USPRO Time Trial 5th Place
2016 UCI Vuelta Indipendencia Nacional Republica Dominicana Stage 7 1st Pla

References

External links
 
 
 
 

1975 births
Living people
American male cyclists